The Central Bureau of Investigation (CBI) is the premier investigating agency of India. It operates under the jurisdiction of the Ministry of Personnel, Public Grievances and Pensions. Originally set up to investigate bribery and governmental corruption, in 1965 it received expanded jurisdiction to investigate breaches of central laws enforceable by the Government of India, multi-state organised crime, multi-agency or international cases. The CBI has attracted numerous controversies and criticisms due to various reports of irregular practises, excessive political influence, and a poor conviction rate. CBI is exempted from the provisions of the Right to Information Act. CBI is India's officially designated single point of contact for liaison with the Interpol.

The CBI headquarter is  located in CGO Complex, near Jawaharlal Nehru Stadium in New Delhi.

History

Special Police Establishment
The Bureau of Investigation traces its origins to the Special Police Establishment (SPE), a Central Government Police force, which was set up in 1941 by the Government of India to investigate bribery and corruption in transactions with the War and Supply Department of India. It had its headquarters in Lahore. The Superintendent of the SPE was Qurban Ali Khan, who later opted for Pakistan during the Partition of India. The first legal adviser of the War Department was Rai Sahib Karam Chand Jain. After the end of the war, there was a continued need for a central governmental agency to investigate bribery and corruption by central-government employees. Sahib Karam Chand Jain remained its legal advisor when the department was transferred to the Home Department by the 1946 Delhi Special Police Establishment Act.

This is DSPE's scope was enlarged to cover all departments of the Government of India. Its jurisdiction extended to the Union Territories, and could be further extended to the states with the consent of the state governments involved. Sardar Patel, first Deputy Prime Minister of free India and head of the Home Department, desired to weed out corruption in erstwhile princely states such as Jodhpur, Rewa and Tonk. Patel directed Legal Advisor Karam Chand Jain to monitor criminal proceedings against the dewans and chief ministers of those states. The DSPE acquired its popular current name, Central Bureau of Investigation, through a Home Ministry resolution on 1 April 1963.

CBI takes shape 
The CBI established a reputation as India's foremost investigative agency with the resources for complicated cases, and it was requested to assist the investigation of crimes such as murder, kidnapping and terrorism. The Supreme Court and a number of High Courts in the country also began assigning such investigations to the CBI on the basis of petitions filed by aggrieved parties. In 1987, the CBI was divided into the following divisions: the Anti-Corruption Division, the Special Crimes Division, the Economic Offences Division, the Policy and International Police Cooperation Division, the Administration Division, the Directorate of Prosecution Division and the Central Forensic Science Laboratory Division.

D. P. Kohli 
SPE was track many criminal in jail 

The founding director of the CBI was D. P. Kohli, who held the office from 1 April 1963 to 31 May 1968. Before this, Kohli was Inspector-general of police for the Special Police Establishment from 1955 to 1963 and held law-enforcement positions in Madhya Bharat (as chief of police), Uttar Pradesh and local central-government offices. For distinguished service, Kohli was awarded the Padma Bhushan in 1967. Kohli saw in the Special Police Establishment the potential to growing into a National Investigative Agency. He nurtured the organisation during his long career as inspector general and director and laid the foundation on which the agency grew.

CBI directors

Organisation 

The CBI is headed by a Director, an IPS officer with a rank of Director General of Police. The director is selected by a high-profile committee constituted under The Delhi Special Police Establishment (DSPE) Act, 1946 as amended through The Lokpal and Lokayuktas Act, 2013, and has a two-year term (can be extended for another three years). Other ranks in the CBI which may be staffed by the IRS (Indian Revenue Service) officer and the IPS are Special Director, Additional Director, Joint Director, Deputy Inspector General of Police, Senior Superintendent of Police, Superintendent of Police, Additional Superintendent of Police, Deputy Superintendent of Police. Inspector, Sub-Inspector, Assistant Sub-Inspector, Head constable, Constable which are recruited through SSC or through deputation from Police, Income Tax Department and Customs Department.

Constitutional status 

Gauhati High Court had given a verdict on 6 November 2013, that CBI is unconstitutional and does not hold a legal status. However, the Supreme Court of India stayed this verdict when challenged by the central government and next hearing on this is fixed on 6 December 2013. Some legal experts believe that the ultimate solution for Indian government is to formulate a law for CBI as sooner or later the Supreme Court may hold the constitution of CBI unconstitutional. As of 2021, CBI is not a statutory body, and it's not a constitutional body. It continues to derive its powers from Delhi Special Police Establishment Act, 1946.

Demand for greater autonomy 
Demanding independent investigations, the CBI said that although it deferred to the government's authority in non-corruption cases, the agency felt that sufficient financial and administrative powers were required by the director (including a minimum three-year tenure to ensure "functional autonomy"). "As such, it is necessary that the director, CBI, should be vested with ex-officio powers of the Secretary to the Government of India, reporting directly to the minister, without having to go through the DoPT", the agency said, adding that financial powers were not enough and it wanted a separate budget allocation. Some form of autonomy has been granted by the Supreme Court of India to CBI when it held that CBI can prosecute senior bureaucrats without central government's permission. Indian Supreme Court also held that Section 6A of DSPE Act is unconstitutional.

Appointment Committee and Selection committee 
The CBI Director is appointed, for not less than a term of 2 years, by the Appointment Committee on recommendation of Selection Committee as mentioned in DSPE Act 1946 amended through the Lokpal & Lokayukta Act 2013 and CVC Act, 2003 respectively. The Appointment Committee consists of:
 Prime MinisterChairperson
 Leader of Opposition of Loksabha or the Leader of the single largest opposition party in the Lok Sabha, if the former is not present due to lack of mandated strength in the Lok Sabha - member
 Chief Justice of India or a Supreme Court Judge recommended by the Chief Justicemember

When making recommendations, the committee considers the views of the outgoing director.

The Selection Committee constituted under Delhi Special Police Establishment Act 1946 nominates a certain number of names to the Appointment Committee, one among whom the Appointment Committee appoints as the CBI director. The Selection Committee consists of:

NDA government, on 25 November 2014, moved an amendment bill to do away with the requirement of quorum in high-profile committee while recommending the names, for the post of director CBI, to the central government by introducing the clause "no appointment of a (CBI) director shall be invalid merely by reason of any vacancy or absence of members in the panel". and to replace the LOP with leader of single largest opposition party or pre-election coalition as, the LOP post in the Loksabha is vacant.

Infrastructure 

The  building is equipped with a modern communications system, an advanced record-maintenance system, storage space, computerised access control and an additional facility for new technology. Interrogation rooms, cells, dormitories and conference halls are provided. The building has a staff cafeteria with a capacity of 500, gyms, a terrace garden, and bi-level basement parking for 470 vehicles. Advanced fire-control and power-backup systems are provided, in addition to a press briefing room and media lounge.

The CBI Academy in Ghaziabad, Uttar Pradesh (east of Delhi) began in 1996. The  campus, with fields and plantations, houses the administrative, academic, hostel and residential buildings. Before the academy was built a small training centre at Lok Nayak Bhawan, New Delhi, conducted short-term in-service courses. The CBI then relied on state police-training institutions and the Sardar Vallabhbhai Patel National Police Academy in Hyderabad for basic training courses for deputy superintendents of police, sub-inspectors and constables.

The Academy accommodates the training needs of all CBI ranks. Facilities for specialised courses are also made available to the officials of the state police, central police organisations (CPOs), public-sector vigilance organisations, bank and government departments and the Indian Armed Forces.

Jurisdiction, powers and restrictions 

The legal powers of investigation of the CBI are derived from the DSPE Act 1946, which confers powers, duties, privileges and liabilities on the Delhi Special Police Establishment (CBI) and officers of the Union Territories. The central government may extend to any area (except Union Territories) the powers and jurisdiction of the CBI for investigation, subject to the consent of the government of the concerned state. Members of the CBI at or above the rank of sub-inspector may be considered officers in charge of police stations. Under the act, the CBI can investigate only with notification by the central government.

In 2022, responding to a question, The Minister of state in the Prime Minister's office informed Rajya Sabha that a total of nine states had withdrawn general consent to the CBI to investigate cases in those states. The states include West Bengal, Maharashtra, Rajasthan, Kerala and Punjab.

Relationship with state police 

The CBI was originally constituted under the Delhi Special Police Establishment Act, to operate within the territory of Delhi. As policing and law is a subject that falls within state powers under the structure of Indian federalism, the CBI needs prior consent from other state governments in order to conduct investigations within their territory. This consent can be in the form of a 'general consent' under Section 6 of the Delhi Special Police Establishment Act, which remains in operation for all investigations until it is revoked, or alternatively, a 'specific consent' authorising investigations in individual cases. Once consent is granted, the CBI can investigate economic, corruption, and special crimes (including national security, drugs and narcotics, etc.)

Most Indian states had granted general consent to the CBI to investigate crimes within their territory. However, as of 2020, several states have withdrawn their 'general consent' for the CBI to operate, and require a special consent to be granted on a case to case basis. In November 2018, Andhra Pradesh and West Bengal governments withdrew general consents for the CBI to investigate, and accused the Central Government of using federal agencies to destabilise state politics. Andhra Pradesh restored general consent in 2019. In January 2019, Chhattisgarh also withdrew general consent to the CBI. In July 2020, Rajasthan withdrew general consent to the CBI. In October 2020, Maharashtra withdrew general consent to the CBI. In November 2020, Kerala, Jharkhand, and Punjab withdrew general consent to the CBI. Tripura and Mizoram had previously withdrawn general consent to the CBI as well. Altogether, as of November 2021, eight states require prior consent before the CBI can investigate crimes in their territory. On 4 March 2022, Meghalaya has withdrawn general consent to CBI, becoming the ninth state to do so.

High Courts and the Supreme Court 
The High Courts and the Supreme Court have the jurisdiction to order a CBI investigation into an offence alleged to have been committed in a state without the state's consent, according to a five-judge constitutional bench of the Supreme Court (in Civil Appeals 6249 and 6250 of 2001) on 17 Feb 2010. The bench ruled:  The court clarified this is an extraordinary power which must be exercised sparingly, cautiously and only in exceptional situations.
The SC in CBI VS CBI case held that the power to remove/send on leave the director of CBI, vested in the selection committee, not with the central govt. SC says this verdict when CBI Director challenge the decision of central govt to send him on leave without his will.

Exemption from Right to Information (RTI) 

CBI is exempted from the provisions of the Right to Information Act. This exemption was granted by the government on 9 June 2011 (with similar exemptions to the National Investigating Agency (NIA), the Directorate General of Income Tax Investigation and the National Intelligence Grid (Natgrid)) on the basis of national security. It was criticized by the Central Information Commission and RTI activists, who said the blanket exemption violated the letter and intent of the RTI Act. The exemption was upheld in Madras High Court.

Impact and success stories

Conviction rate 
The CBI has a high conviction rate:

Major cases solved
Impact on the multiple high-profile cases, such as Bhanwari Devi murder case, Satyam scandal, Sister Abhaya murder case, and INX Media case.

Controversy and criticism

Corruption 

In 2013, Judge of the Supreme Court of India (and later Chief Justice of India) R. M. Lodha criticized the CBI for being a "caged parrot speaking in its master's voice", due to its excessive political interference irrespective of which party happened to be in power.

Because of the CBI's political overtones, it has been exposed by former officials such as Joginder Singh and B. R. Lall (director and joint director, respectively) as engaging in nepotism, wrongful prosecution and corruption. In Lall's book, Who Owns CBI, he details how investigations are manipulated and derailed. Corruption within the organisation
has been revealed in information obtained under the RTI Act, and RTI activist Krishnanand Tripathi has alleged harassment from the CBI to save itself from exposure via RTI. The states that have withdrawn consent to the CBI have  accused the CBI of being a tool used by the Union Government to unfairly target parties ideologically rival to them.

Political interference 

Normally, cases assigned to the CBI are sensitive and of national importance. It is standard practice for state police departments to register cases under its jurisdiction; if necessary, the central government may transfer a case to the CBI. The agency has been criticised for its mishandling of several scams. It has also been criticized for dragging its feet investigating prominent politicians, such as P. V. Narasimha Rao, Jayalalithaa, Lalu Prasad Yadav, Mayawati and Mulayam Singh Yadav; this tactic leads to their acquittal or non-prosecution.

Bofors scandal 

In January 2006 it was discovered that the CBI had quietly unfrozen bank accounts belonging to Italian businessman Ottavio Quattrocchi, one of those accused in the 1986 Bofors scandal which tainted the government of Rajiv Gandhi. The CBI was responsible for the inquiry into the Bofors case. Associates of then-prime minister Rajiv Gandhi were linked to alleged payoffs made during the mid-1980s by Swedish arms firm AB Bofors, with US million in kickbacks moved from Britain and Panama to secret Swiss banks. The 410 howitzers purchased in the US million arms sale were reported to be inferior to those offered by a French competitor.

The CBI, which unfroze  in a London bank in accounts held by Bofors, accused Quattrocchi and his wife Maria in 2006 but facilitated his travel by asking Interpol to take him off its wanted list on 29 April 2009.
After communications from the CBI, Interpol withdrew the red corner notice on Quattrocchi.

Hawala scandal 

A 1991 arrest of militants in Kashmir led to a raid on hawala brokers, revealing evidence of large-scale payments to national politicians. The Jain hawala case encompassed former Union ministers Ajit Kumar Panja and P. Shiv Shankar, former Uttar Pradesh governor Motilal Vora, Bharatiya Janata Party leader Yashwant Sinha. The 20 defendants were discharged by Special Judge V. B. Gupta in the  650-million case, heard in New Delhi.

The judge ruled that there was no prima facie evidence against the accused which could be converted into legal evidence. Those freed included Bharatiya Janata Party president L. K. Advani; former Union ministers V. C. Shukla, Arjun Singh, Madhavrao Scindia, N. D. Tiwari and R. K. Dhawan, and former Delhi chief minister Madan Lal Khurana. In 1997 a ruling by late Chief Justice of India J. S. Verma listed about two dozen guidelines which, if followed, would have ensured the independence of the investigating agency. Sixteen years later, successive governments circumvent the guidelines and treat the CBI as another wing of the government. Although the prosecution was prompted by a public-interest petition, the cases concluded with no convictions. In Vineet Narain & Others v Union of India AIR 1996 SC 3386, the Supreme Court ruled that the Central Vigilance Commission should have a supervisory role over the CBI.

Priyadarshini Mattoo murder case 

In this case Santosh Kumar Singh, the alleged murderer of a 25-year-old law student, was acquitted for what the judge called "deliberate inaction" by the investigating team. The accused was the son of a high-ranking officer in the Indian Police Service, the reason for the CBI's involvement. The 1999 judgment noted that "the influence of the father of the accused has been there". Embarrassed by the judgment, CBI Director R. K. Raghavan appointed two special directors (P. C. Sharma and Gopal Achari) to study the judgement. The CBI appealed the verdict in Delhi High Court in 2000, and the court issued a warrant for the accused. The CBI applied for an early hearing in July 2006; in October the High Court found Singh guilty of rape and murder, sentencing him to death.

Sister Abhaya 

This case concerns 27 March 1992 death of a nun who was found in a water well in the Saint Pius X convent hostel in Kottayam, Kerala. Five CBI investigations have failed to yield any suspects. The case was solved finally in December 2020 where the Main Accused were sent to life imprisonment by The Kerala High Court.

Sohrabuddin case 
The CBI has been accused of supporting the ruling Congress Party against its opposition, the BJP. The CBI is investigating the Sohrabuddin case in Gujarat; Geeta Johri, also investigating the case, claimed that the CBI is pressuring her to falsely implicate former Gujarat minister Amit Shah.

Sant Singh Chatwal case 
Sant Singh Chatwal was a suspect in CBI records for 14 years. The agency had filed two charge sheets, sent letters rogatory abroad and sent a team to the United States to imprison Chatwal and his wife from 2–5 February 1997. On 30 May 2007 and 10 August 2008 former CBI directors Vijay Shankar and Ashwani Kumar, respectively, signed no-challenge orders on the imprisonment. Later, it was decided not to appeal their release.

This closed a case of bank fraud in which Chatwal had been embroiled for over a decade. Four charges were filed by the CBI, with Chatwal named a defendant in two. The other two trials are still in progress. RTI applicant Krishnanand Tripathi was denied access to public information concerning the closed cases. The Central Information Commission later ordered the CBI to disclose the information; however, the CBI is exempt from the RTI Act (see above). Chatwal is a recipient of the Padma Bhushan.

Malankara Varghese murder case 

This case concerns 5 December 2002 death of T. M. Varghese (also known as Malankara Varghese), a member of the Malankara Orthodox Church managing committee and a timber merchant. Varghese Thekkekara, a priest and manager of the Angamali diocese of the rival Jacobite Syrian Christian Church (part of the Syriac Orthodox Church), was charged with murder and conspiracy on 9 May 2010. Thekkekara was not arrested after he was charged, for which the CBI was criticised by the Kerala High Court and the media.

Bhopal gas tragedy 

The CBI was publicly seen as ineffective in trying the 1984 Bhopal disaster case. Former CBI joint director B. R. Lall has said that he was asked to remain soft on extradition for Union Carbide CEO Warren Anderson and drop the charges (which included culpable homicide). Those accused received two-year sentences.

2G spectrum case 

The UPA government has been accused of allocating 2G spectrum to corporations at very low prices through corrupt and illegal means. The Supreme Court cited the CBI many times for its tardiness in the investigations; only after the court began monitoring its investigations were high-profile arrests made.

Indian coal allocation scam

This is a political scandal concerning the Indian UPA government's allocation of the nation's coal deposits to private companies by the former Prime Minister Manmohan Singh, which cost the government . CBI director Ranjit Sinha submitted an affidavit in the Supreme Court that the coal-scam status report prepared by the agency was shared with Congress Party law minister Ashwani Kumar "as desired by him" and with secretary-level officers from the prime minister's office (PMO) and the coal ministry before presenting it to the court.

2008 Noida double murder case

This is a double murder case of 14-year-old girl Aarushi Talwar and 45-year-old Hemraj Banjade from Noida, India. On 26 November 2013, Parents of girl named Rajesh and Nupur Talwar were sentenced to life imprisonment for the twin murders. In January 2014, the Talwars challenged the decision in the Allahabad High Court. The High Court's acquitted them of all charges on 12 October 2017 because of the lack of 'irresistible proof'. The Allahabad HC in its verdict said that there were loopholes in the evidence which found the parents not guilty. Court also said that CBI tampered evidences and tutored witnesses. Questions arose by nation on investigation and judgement given by CBI court.

In Popular Culture
The CBI has been portrayed in the Malayalam film series known as the CBI (film series) written by S. N. Swamy and directed by K. Madhu with actor Mammootty portraying the lead role of CBI officer Sethurama Iyer.

See also 
 Directorate of Revenue Intelligence, anti-smuggling 
 Enforcement Directorate, anti economic crimes
 Financial Intelligence Unit, anti money laundering
 National Investigation Agency, anti terrorism
 NIA Most Wanted
 Narcotics Control Bureau, anti drug trafficking 
 List of Indian intelligence agencies

References

Further reading
 Bhar, Sujit.

External links 
 
 

 
1941 establishments in India
Government agencies established in 1941
Law enforcement agencies of India
Indian intelligence agencies
Domestic intelligence agencies